Saturday Night Live in the 2000s is a two-hour documentary television special that showcases the years of Saturday Night Live from 2000 to 2009.  It features interviews with the cast and crew from those years, and aired on NBC on April 15, 2010.

Topics discussed include Jimmy Fallon and Tina Fey as the new Weekend Update anchors after the departure of Colin Quinn, how SNL became popular for its spoofs on the 2000 United States presidential election, how the show's humor survived the 9/11 attacks and the anthrax scare, Will Ferrell's departure at the end of season 27 and the search for a replacement cast member to play George W. Bush, SNL'''s shaky years between seasons 28 and 30 due to Jimmy Fallon's and Horatio Sanz's cracking up on camera, Jimmy Fallon's departure from the show, Amy Poehler teaming up with Tina Fey for Weekend Update, the hiring of Bill Hader, Andy Samberg, and Kristen Wiig, and SNL regaining its popularity with the Digital Shorts, and fan-favorite host Justin Timberlake.

Fred Armisen, Alec Baldwin, Rachel Dratch, Abby Elliott, Jimmy Fallon, Steve Higgins, Will Ferrell, Tina Fey, Will Forte, Bill Hader, Darrell Hammond, Chris Kattan, Marci Klein, John McCain, Seth Meyers, Lorne Michaels, Tracy Morgan, Bobby Moynihan, Chris Parnell, Amy Poehler, Maya Rudolph, Andy Samberg, Horatio Sanz, Akiva Schaffer, Molly Shannon, Michael Shoemaker, Jason Sudeikis, Jorma Taccone, Kenan Thompson, Justin Timberlake, Christopher Walken and Kristen Wiig provided comments for the special.

Other SNL specials
A special called The Women of Saturday Night Live was planned to air on NBC before the 2000s decade special. Instead, it would later air in November 2010, reuniting past female cast members. Additional "decade" specials were Live from New York : The First 5 Years of SNL, Saturday Night Live in the '80s: Lost and Found (2005), and Saturday Night Live in the '90s: Pop Culture Nation'' (2007). These highlighted past cast members and skits from the show.

External links
 
 Official NBC website

 
2010 in American television
American documentary television films
Documentary films about comedy and comedians
Documentary films about television
Films directed by Kenneth Bowser